Joint custody is a form of child custody pursuant to which custody rights are awarded to both parents. Joint custody may refer to joint physical custody, joint legal custody, or both combined.

In joint legal custody, both parents of a child share major decision making regarding for example education, medical care and religious upbringing. In joint physical custody, also called shared parenting or shared residency, the child spends equal or close to equal amount of time with both parents.

After a divorce or separation, parents may have joint physical custody as well as joint legal custody of their children, or commonly, they may have joint legal custody while one parent has sole physical custody, or rarely, they may have joint physical custody while one parent have sole legal custody.

The opposite of joint physical custody is sole custody, where the child primarily lives with one parent while the other parent may have visitation rights to regularly see his or her child. Joint physical custody is different from split custody, where some siblings live with one parent while other siblings live with the other parent.

History
In England, prior to the 19th century, common law considered children to be the property of their father. However, the economic and social changes that occurred during the 19th century led to a shift in ideas about the dynamics of the family. Industrialization separated the home and the workplace, keeping fathers away from their children in order to earn wages and provide for their family. Conversely, mothers were expected to stay in the home and care for the household and the children. Important social changes such as women's suffrage and child development theories allowed for ideas surrounding the importance of maternal care.

Joint legal custody
In joint legal custody, both parents share decision-making rights with regard to matters that may have a significant impact on their children's lives, such as where a child should attend school, the choice of a primary care physician or therapist for the child, and medical treatments. Both parents also have the ability right access to their children's records, such as educational records, health records, and other records. Under sole physical custody arrangements, joint legal custody has been found to have beneficial effects on children compared to sole legal custody.

Joint physical custody

In joint physical custody, the child lives an equal amount of time with both parents or for considerable amount of time with each parent. Typically, the family court issues a parenting schedule that defines the time that the child will spend with each parent.

The percentage of joint physical versus sole physical custody varies between countries. In a comparative survey from 2005/06, covering children ages 11 to 15, it was highest in Sweden with 17% and lowest in Turkey and the Ukraine with only 1%.

Studies suggest that joint custody may significantly contribute to a child's wellbeing, with lower rates of mental health issues and substance abuse, better school performance, better physical health and better family relationships as compared to children in households where one parent has sole physical custody. On the whole, studies show that children experience better outcomes in joint custody arrangements and where they have good access to both parents. While not all studies of joint custody have resulted in similar findings, none have found that harm results from joint custody.

Japan
Joint custody is not legally recognized in Japan. Japanese courts favor granting custody to a primary caregiver, and nearly always award custody to the parent who is in possession of the children, even in the aftermath of parental kidnapping. Many Japanese parents believe that recognition of joint custody rights will reduce the problem of parental kidnapping and improve parent-child relationships following a custody case.

Spain

In a 2005/06 survey, about 6 percent of Spanish children ages 11 to 15 lived in a joint physical custody arrangement versus sole physical custody.

Joint physical custody was introduced into Spanish law in 2005, subject to agreement by both parents. Some regions, such as Aragon and Catalonia, have subsequently passed laws that makes it the preferred option.

United Kingdom

In the United Kingdom in 2005/06, about 7 percent of 11-15 year old children lived in a joint physical versus sole physical custody arrangement.

United States

In the United States, joint legal custody is common while joint physical custody is rare. According to a 2005/06 survey, about 5 percent of American children ages 11 to 15 lived in a joint physical custody arrangement versus sole physical custody. Kentucky is the only state with a legal rebuttable presumption in favor of joint physical custody.

References

See also

Child custody
Juvenile law
Divorce
Family law
Marriage
Parenting
Fathers' rights
Mothers' rights